Yahya ibn al-Mundhir al-Tuğībī al-Mudhaffar was the second head of the Banu Tujib clan and emir of the Taifa of Zaragoza from 1022 to 1036.

References
 List of Muslim rulers

Emirs of Zaragoza
11th-century rulers in Al-Andalus
11th-century Arabs